Central Etobicoke High School (or Central Etobicoke, CEHS, formerly Westway High School) is a secondary school in Toronto, Ontario, Canada. It is located at 10 Denfield Street, bordered by Widdicombe Hill Blvd to the South and Clement Rd to the North, in the Richview neighbourhood of the former suburb of Etobicoke. It is operated by the Toronto District School Board since being transferred from the Etobicoke Board of Education in 1997.

History 
Westway High School was established as a small high school in 1969 by the Etobicoke Board of Education.

As enrolment decreased in Etobicoke's public schools during the 1980s, many seriously underpopulated public schools in the area were abandoned as the children were transferred to the Catholic school system when full funding was introduced. As a result, Central Etobicoke High School was formed in 1988 at the same site and assimilated its basic level programs at Westway, Humbergrove Secondary School and Kingsmill Secondary School, with both of the latter schools closed and transferred to the Metropolitan Separate School Board (now the Toronto Catholic District School Board).

Clubs
CEHS clubs include music, movie making, walking club, and story telling.

See also
List of high schools in Ontario

References

External links 
Central Etobicoke High School
TDSB Profile

Education in Etobicoke
High schools in Toronto
Schools in the TDSB
Educational institutions established in 1969
1969 establishments in Ontario
Educational institutions established in 1988
1988 establishments in Ontario